The 1936–37 Connecticut State Huskies men's basketball team represented Connecticut State College, now the University of Connecticut, in the 1936–37 collegiate men's basketball season. The Huskies completed the season with an 11–7 overall record. The Huskies were members of the New England Conference, where they ended the season with a 5–3 record. The Huskies played their home games at Hawley Armory in Storrs, Connecticut, and were led by first-year head coach Don White.

Schedule 

|-
!colspan=12 style=""| Regular Season

Schedule Source:

References 

UConn Huskies men's basketball seasons
Connecticut
1936 in sports in Connecticut
1937 in sports in Connecticut